Mnesictena marmarina, also known as the brown nettle moth, is a snout moth in the subfamily Spilomelinae of the family Crambidae. It was first described by Edward Meyrick in 1884. It is endemic to New Zealand. This species is similar in appearance to Mnesictena flavidalis but is distinguished by being larger in size and having a clear white spot on its forewings.

Larvae of this species feed on plants in the genus Urtica, including Urtica ferox.

References

External links
Image of M. marmarina

Moths described in 1884
Moths of New Zealand
Endemic fauna of New Zealand
Taxa named by Edward Meyrick
marmarina
Endemic moths of New Zealand